KRMG-FM (102.3 MHz) is a commercial radio station licensed to Sand Springs, Oklahoma, and serving the Tulsa metropolitan area. The station is owned by Cox Media Group and airs a conservative news/talk radio format, simulcast with co-owned AM 740 KRMG.

Weekdays begin with The KRMG Morning News anchored by Dan Potter. The KRMG Evening News is anchored by Skyler Cooper in PM drive time. The rest of the weekday schedule is made up of nationally syndicated talk shows hosted by Sean Hannity, Erick Erickson, Brian Kilmeade, Dana Loesch, Jimmy Failla, Mark Kaye and Markley, Van Camp & Robbins.  Weekends feature shows on money, health, real estate, cars, gardening, home repair, law and technology, some of which are paid brokered programming. Weekend hosts include Kim Komando, Bill Handel and Chad Benson. KRMG-AM-FM have a local news and weather sharing arrangement with co-owned Fox affiliate KOKI-TV (channel 23), with world and national news supplied by ABC News Radio.

The studios and offices are located on South Memorial Drive near Interstate 44 in Tulsa.  KRMG-FM's transmitter is on Route 97 on the Osage Reservation in Sand Springs.  KRMG-AM-FM are also heard on Cox Digital Cable channel 960 in Tulsa.

History
In June 1989, the station first signed on as KTOW-FM.  It was owned by Music Sound Radio and was the FM counterpart of KTOW (now KJMU), with the two stations simulcasting a modern rock format.  KTOW-FM ran at only 1,700 watts, a fraction of its current power.  In the early 1990s, it flipped to urban contemporary as "Mix 102.3," giving Tulsa its first urban station on the FM dial since KKUL left the air in the late 1970s.

In 1995, KTOW-AM-FM were sold to Bill Payne.  KTOW-FM changed to a classic country format as KTFX.  Payne received permission from the Federal Communications Commission to boost the station's power to 50,000 watts, allowing it to be heard all around Tulsa and its growing suburbs.

In 1999, Payne sold the stations to Cox Radio for $3.5 million. Cox changed KTFX's format to active rock as KRTQ ("Rock 102.3") to compete against heritage rocker KMOD-FM. (The KTFX format and call letters moved to 103.3 MHz, now co-owned KJSR.)  In 2005, KRTQ dropped its rock format and changed to contemporary Christian music as KKCM ("Spirit 102.3"), competing against heritage contemporary Christian station KXOJ-FM. The "Spirit" format leaned towards adult contemporary, with its playlist made up of Christian hits from the 1980s to then-current titles.

On March 16, 2009, the contemporary Christian format was dropped for a simulcast of AM sister station KRMG, with the call sign switched to KRMG-FM. (In the 1960s, the KRMG-FM call letters had been used on 95.5, now co-owned KWEN.)  The move allows KRMG's news/talk programming to be heard on both the FM and AM dial, and improves KRMG's coverage in parts of Tulsa when the AM station adjusts its coverage at night.  The Christian format can still be heard on Cox Digital Cable channel 962.

On July 7, 2014, KRMG-AM-FM changed their slogan to "Tulsa’s 24-hour News, Weather and Traffic, News 102.3 and AM 740 KRMG."

The station changed its positioning again on July 15, 2019, and currently brands itself as "102.3 KRMG, Tulsa's News and Talk."

References

External links
 

RMG-FM
News and talk radio stations in the United States
Cox Media Group
Radio stations established in 1989
1989 establishments in Oklahoma